The 2021–22 PSA World Tour is a series of men's and women's squash tournaments which are part of the Professional Squash Association (PSA) PSA World Tour from August 2021 until July 2022. The PSA World Tour tournaments are some of the most prestigious events on the men's and women's tour. The best-performing players in the World Tour events qualify for the annual Men's and Women's Finals.

Starting in August 2018, PSA replaced World Series tournaments with new PSA World Tour, comprising four new tournament-tiers: Platinum ($164,500–$180,500), Gold ($100,000–$120,500), Silver ($70,000–$88,000) and Bronze ($51,000–$53,000) each one awarding different points.

PSA World Tour Ranking Points
PSA World Tour events also have a separate World Tour ranking. Points for this are calculated on a cumulative basis after each World Tour event. The top eight players at the end of the calendar year are then eligible to play in the PSA World Tour Finals.

Ranking points vary according to tournament tier being awarded as follows:

Men's

Tournaments

Standings

Bold – Players qualified for the final
(*) – Winners of Platinum's tournaments automatically qualifies for Finals.

Women's

Tournaments

Standings

Bold – Players qualified for the final
(*) – Winners of Platinum's tournaments automatically qualifies for Finals.

See also
2021–22 PSA World Tour
Official Men's Squash World Ranking
Official Women's Squash World Ranking

References

External links 
 PSA World Tour Ranking website

PSA World Tour
2021 in squash
2022 in squash